Tullo Morgagni (Forlì, 25 September 1881 – Verona, 2 August 1919) was an Italian journalist and sports race director. He was the founder of several Italian cycling races, notably the Giro d'Italia, Milan–San Remo and the Giro di Lombardia.

Biography
Tullo Morgagni started working as a journalist for the Milan-based newspaper L'Italia del Popolo, which voiced liberal and republican politics in northern Italy at the turn of the 20th century. Later he became editor of newspapers Il Secolo and La Gazzetta dello Sport, for which he created the weekly sports magazine Lo Sport Illustrato. As an aviation enthusiast, he also became an editor for aircraft magazine Il Cielo.

In 1905 he took the initiative in organizing the newly created race Milan–Milan, which was renamed Giro di Lombardia two years later. He also created Milan–San Remo in 1907 and the Giro d'Italia in 1908. These three races have become the quintessential races of Italian cycling and some of the most iconic races of cycling history.

He and everyone else aboard died in the 2 August 1919 Verona Caproni Ca.48 airliner crash. In 2009, the football stadium of Forlì was renamed Stadio Tullo Morgagni in Morgagni's honour.

References

1881 births
1919 deaths
People from Forlì
Italian sports journalists
Cycling journalists
Aviators killed in aviation accidents or incidents in Italy
Victims of aviation accidents or incidents in 1919
Italian aviators
20th-century Italian journalists
Italian magazine founders